Abuzar Brigade, ( Liwa' 'Abuzr,),, also known as Abuzar Division, is an Afghan Shia brigade that voluntarily fought for Iranian side in the Iran–Iraq War in (1980–1988). During the War, these fighters were stationed in the  mountainous areas of Loolan and Navcheh in the northwestern Iran, as they had experience in mountain warfare and irregular warfare during the war against the Soviets.

History
Recently IRGC create the newly Liwa Fatemiyoun, an Afghan Shia militia formed in 2014 to fight in Syria on the side of the government. It is funded, trained, and equipped by the Iranian Revolutionary Guards, and fights under the command of Iranian officers. However, the group has denied direct Iranian government involvement in its activities. According to late deputy commander Sayed Hakim, the group numbers between 12,000–14,000 fighters.

References

Iran–Iraq War
Expatriate military units and formations
Military units and formations established in 1980
Military units and formations disestablished in 1988